List of Australia's national representative rowers is a list of rowers who have represented Australia at the senior level at either World Rowing Championships, Olympic or Paralympic Games or a Commonwealth Games. The list does not include rowers who have only represented at the junior or U23 level or only at a Trans-Tasman series or World Rowing Cups.

In October 2015 Rowing Australia launched the McVilly-Pearce pin, named after Cecil McVilly, Australia's first Olympic rowing representative and Bobby Pearce, the first Australian rower to win an Olympic gold. Every Australian senior level representative rower is to receive a specially numbered pin to commemorate the first time they were honoured with Australian selection for an international championship regatta. Accordingly, the McVilly-Pearce pin number series is a chronological sequence of the rowers who have represented Australia at the senior level.

References 

Australian male rowers
Australian female rowers